Deb is a given name, usually feminine and often a shortened version (hypocorism) of Deborah or Debra.

People named Deb include:

Women
 Deb Conroy, member of the Illinois House of Representatives since 2013
 Debra Deb Covey (born 1961), Canadian former field hockey player
 Debra Deb Fischer (born 1951), senior U.S. Senator from the state of Nebraska
 Deb Foskey (born 1949), Australian former politician
 Deborah Deb Frecklington (born 1971), Australian politician
 Debra Deb Kiel (born 1957), American politician
 Deborah Deb Matthews (born c. 1953), Canadian politician
 Deborah Deb Mell (born 1968), American politician
 Deborah Deb Placey (born 1966), news anchor/reporter for the National Hockey League New Jersey Devils' televised games
 Deb Rey (born 1967), American politician
 Deb Richard (born 1963), American former golfer
 Deborah Deb Schulte (born c. 1960), Canadian Member of Parliament
 Deb Soholt, member of the South Dakota Senate since 2013
 Deborah Deb Whitten (born 1966), former field hockey goalkeeper from Canada
 Deborah Deb Willet (1650–1678), a young maid employed by Samuel Pepys, with whom she had a liaison

Men
 Deb Mukherjee, Indian Bengali actor
 Deb Roy, Canadian professor at MIT and Chief Media Scientist of Twitter

See also 
 

English feminine given names
English given names
Feminine given names
Hypocorisms